There is also an asteroid called 218 Bianca.

Bianca is an inner satellite of Uranus. It was discovered from the images taken by Voyager 2 on January 23, 1986, and was given the temporary designation S/1986 U 9. It was named after the sister of Katherine in Shakespeare's play The Taming of the Shrew. It is also designated Uranus VIII.

Bianca belongs to the Portia group of satellites, which also includes Cressida, Desdemona, Juliet, Portia, Rosalind, Cupid, Belinda and Perdita. These satellites have similar orbits and photometric properties. Other than its orbit, radius of 27 km, and geometric albedo of 0.08 virtually nothing is known about it.

In Voyager 2 images Bianca appears as an elongated object, the major axis pointing towards Uranus. The ratio of axes of the Bianca's prolate spheroid is 0.7 ± 0.2. Its surface is grey in color.

See also 

 Moons of Uranus

References 

Explanatory notes

Citations

External links 
 Bianca Profile by NASA's Solar System Exploration
 Uranus' Known Satellites (by Scott S. Sheppard)

Moons of Uranus
19860123
Moons with a prograde orbit
The Taming of the Shrew